Owen Pierce Evans (June 30, 1927 – March 12, 2018) was an American football player and coach. He served as the head football coach at the University of Dubuque from 1962 to 1968.  Evans was also the head football coach at several Wisconsin high schools during his career and was inducted into the Wisconsin Football Coaches Hall of Fame.

Head coaching record

College

References

External links
 

1927 births
2018 deaths
Dubuque Spartans football coaches
Wisconsin–La Crosse Eagles football players
Wisconsin–Oshkosh Titans football coaches
High school football coaches in Wisconsin
People from Racine, Wisconsin
Players of American football from Wisconsin